"Born" is a song written and performed by Barry Gibb that was included on his originally unreleased debut album, The Kid's No Good in 1970. On the Ladybird version of the album, the song was the 12th track. It was one of the first songs he recorded for his first solo album. The song's style was closer to the 1971 song "Everybody Clap" by Lulu.

Recording
It was recorded on 22 February 1970 along with "A Child, A Girl, A Woman", "Mando Bay", "Clyde O'Reilly" and "Peace in My Mind". The song was covered by P.P. Arnold twice; the first was recorded on 4 April 1970 along with "Happiness" (also a Barry Gibb song), as well as cover versions of "You've Made Me So Very Happy" and "Spinning Wheel", the session was produced by Gibb himself, the second version was recorded on 10 June 1970. The second recording is called "Born to Be Free" in the tape library, Gibb's version contains the line 'born to be free', and that second recording was the last session of Arnold produced by Gibb.

The musicians played on the lead guitar and drums on Gibb's version were not credited. The harmony on the Gibb recording was sung by Gibb himself and Arnold. The song also features Arnold's falsetto in response to Barry's line 'I was born to be free'.

Personnel
 Barry Gibb — lead and harmony vocals, guitar
 P.P. Arnold  — harmony vocals
 Bill Shepherd  — orchestral arrangement
 Uncredited  — lead guitar, drums

References

Barry Gibb songs
1970 songs
Unreleased songs
Songs written by Barry Gibb
Song recordings produced by Barry Gibb
Blues rock songs